Leonardo Augusto Bonifácio (born 14 January 1983 in Foz do Iguaçu, Paraná), commonly known as Léo Bonfim, is a Brazilian professional footballer who plays for S.C. Salgueiros 08 in Portugal as a central defender.

Football career
After playing youth football for Cruzeiro Esporte Clube and Vila Nova Futebol Clube, Léo Bonfim began his senior career in 2002 with amateurs Sociedade Desportiva Serra Futebol Clube. Four years later he competed with Associação Portuguesa de Desportos in the Série B, remaining in the same division in the next season, with Ceará Sporting Club.

During the winter transfer window of 2007–08, Portuguese top level team Vitória de Setúbal brought Bonfim to his ranks. After only one league match during the entire campaign he left for another team in the country, second division's Gondomar SC.

In the 2009 summer Bonfim signed with NK Olimpija Ljubljana in the Slovenian First League, but after one season he returned to Portugal, joining Boavista F.C. in level three.

References

External links

Prva Liga profile 

1983 births
Living people
Brazilian footballers
Association football defenders
Associação Portuguesa de Desportos players
Ceará Sporting Club players
Primeira Liga players
Liga Portugal 2 players
Segunda Divisão players
Slovenian PrvaLiga players
Vitória F.C. players
Gondomar S.C. players
Boavista F.C. players
Associação Naval 1º de Maio players
S.C. Salgueiros players
NK Olimpija Ljubljana (2005) players
Brazilian expatriate footballers
Expatriate footballers in Portugal
Expatriate footballers in Slovenia
Brazilian expatriate sportspeople in Portugal
Brazilian expatriate sportspeople in Slovenia